Bradley Junction (also known as Bradley) is an unincorporated community and census-designated place in southwestern Polk County, Florida, United States. Its population was 542 as of the 2020 census.

History

Bradley Junction is named for the railroad junction located in the community, which was historically the junction between the Seaboard Air Line Railroad (the east-west track) and the Charlotte Harbor and Northern Railway (the north-south track).  The junction itself is named after phosphate mining company executive Peter B. Bradley, who chartered the Charlotte Harbor and Northern Railway in 1905. The railroad junction still exists today and both lines are now owned by CSX Transportation.  In the mid 1990s, the Florida Gulf Coast Railroad Museum (now the Florida Railroad Museum) moved the railroad station from Bradley Junction to Parrish. The depot was then consumed by a fire soon after the move.

Geography
Bradley Junction is located at 27.795  degrees north, 81.98056 degrees west (27.795, -81.98056). The elevation for the community is 135 feet above sea level.

Demographics

Education
The community of Bradley Junction is served by Polk County Public Schools.

References

External links
Bradley Junction profile from Hometown Locator
Map of Bradley Junction from Mapquest

Unincorporated communities in Polk County, Florida
Census-designated places in Florida
Unincorporated communities in Florida
Former municipalities in Florida